The Svea class was a class of coastal defence ships of the Swedish Royal Navy. The class comprised Svea, Göta and Thule.

Design

Dimensions and machinery

Armour

Armament
The main armament of the ships was a  twin turret gun. Secondary armament included four single  guns and six  single guns.

Construction
Svea and Göta were both laid down at the Lindholmen in Gothenburg and launched on 12 December 1886 and 30 September 1891, respectively. Thule was laid down at the Finnboda Yard in Nacka and launched in 1893.

Turrets
All the main battery turrets of the Svea-class ships were installed at Ellenabbsfortet, located at Aspö, a small island near Karlskrona harbour. The guns were removed in 1936. The turrets were scrapped.

Notes

Citations

References

Further reading

External links
Description of class

Svea-class coastal defence ships
Coastal defense ship classes